= Slough Half Marathon =

Road running event in Berkshire, England

- Date: October
- Location: Slough, Berkshire, United Kingdom
- Event type: Road
- Distance: Half Marathon
- Established: 1982 - 2001, 2018 -

The Slough Half Marathon is a race that takes place every October in Slough, Berkshire, and is run over a distance of 21.0975 kilometres (13.1094 mi).
